Rhadinoloricaria stewarti is a species of catfish in the family Loricariidae. It is native to South America, where it occurs in the drainage basin of the Cononaco River, a tributary of the Napo River, in Ecuador. The species was described in 2020 as part of a redescription of the genus Rhadinoloricaria conducted by Francisco Provenzano (of the Central University of Venezuela) and Ramiro Barriga-Salazar. FishBase does not yet list this species.

References 

Loricariidae
Fish described in 2020
Catfish of South America
Fish of Ecuador